Miriam Dattke (born 24 June 1998) is a German athlete competing in long-distance events.

Her achievements include winning the half marathon at both the 2019 German Athletics Championships, and the 2021 Championships. She has also won a gold medal at the European Athletics U20 Championships and a silver medal at the European Athletics U23 Championships. She competed in women's marathon at the 2022 European Athletics Championships, where she placed fourth, with same time as bronze medalist Nienke Brinkman.

Personal life
Dattke was born in Mannheim, Germany, to a German father and Rwandan mother.

References

External links

1998 births
Living people
Sportspeople from Mannheim
German female long-distance runners
German national athletics champions
German people of Rwandan descent